Illaenus is a genus of trilobites from Russia and Morocco, from the middle Ordovician.

They are without glabella and without articulation of the tail. The cephalon has a high profile and recurved genal spines. Eyes are distant from the axis of the head, situated nearer to the edge.

Selected species
This genus includes about 50 species:

Illaenus alveatus Raymond 1925
Illaenus auriculatus Ross, Jr. & Barnes 1967
Illaenus bayfieldi Billings 1859
Illaenus bucculentus Whittington 1963
Illaenus consimilis Billings 1865
Illaenus consobrinus Billings 1865
Illaenus crassicauda Wahlenberg 1826
Illaenus fraternus Billings 1865
Illaenus gelasinus Whittington 1965
Illaenus lacertus Whittington 1954
Illaenus marginalis Raymond 1925
Illaenus oscitatus Fortey 1980
Illaenus slancyensis Krylov 2016
Illaenus spiculatus Whittington 1963
Illaenus tauricornis Kutorga 1848
Illaenus tumidifrons Billings 1865
Illaenus utahensis Hintze 1952
Illaenus welchi Loch & Ethington 2017

See also
Ordovician fauna of Putilovo village

References 

Yvonne Howells, "Ordovician Trilobites of St. Petersburg Region"

External links 
Russian Trilobites
Saint Petesburg Paleontological Laboratory

Corynexochida genera
Illaenina
Ordovician trilobites
Fossils of Morocco
Fossils of Russia
Bromide Formation
Paleozoic life of Ontario
Paleozoic life of Newfoundland and Labrador
Paleozoic life of the Northwest Territories
Paleozoic life of Nunavut
Paleozoic life of Quebec
Paleozoic life of Yukon